Abraham Zapruder (May 15, 1905 – August 30, 1970) was a Ukrainian-born American clothing manufacturer who witnessed the assassination of United States President John F. Kennedy in Dallas, Texas, on November 22, 1963. He unexpectedly captured the shooting in a home movie while filming the presidential limousine and motorcade as it traveled through Dealey Plaza. The Zapruder film is regarded as the most complete footage of the assassination.

Early life
Zapruder was born into a Ukrainian-Jewish family in the city of Kovel, the Russian Empire (now Ukraine), the son of Israel Zapruder. He received only four years of formal education in Ukraine. In 1909, his father left for North America. In 1918, Abraham Zapruder left Kovel for Warsaw with his family. At some point, Zapruder's brother was pulled off a train and murdered in front of his family, apparently by Polish guards. In 1920, his family emigrated to the United States, settling in Brooklyn, New York where they were reunited with Israel Zapruder.

Studying English at night, he found work as a clothing pattern maker in Manhattan's garment district. In 1933, he married Lillian Sapovnik (1913–1993), with whom he had two children. Zapruder was a Freemason and an Inspector-General (33rd degree) of the Scottish Rite.

In 1941, Zapruder moved to Dallas, Texas, to work for Nardis, a local sportswear company. In 1949, he co-founded Jennifer Juniors, Inc., producing the Chalet and Jennifer Juniors brands of dresses. From the summer of 1953 to April 1954, Zapruder worked at Nardis side by side with Jeanne LeGon. His Jennifer Juniors offices were on the fourth floor of the Dal-Tex Building, across the street from the Texas School Book Depository.

Witness to Kennedy assassination

Filming of assassination

At the time of the assassination, Zapruder was an admirer of President Kennedy and considered himself a Democrat. Zapruder had originally planned to film the motorcade carrying President Kennedy through downtown Dallas on November 22, but he decided not to film the event because it had been raining that morning. When he arrived at work that morning without his camera, Zapruder's assistant insisted that he retrieve it from home before going to Dealey Plaza because the weather had cleared.

Zapruder's movie camera was an 8 mm Bell & Howell Zoomatic Director Series Model 414 PD—top-of-the-line when it was purchased in 1962. Zapruder had planned to film the motorcade from his office window but decided to choose a more optimal spot in Dealey Plaza where the motorcade would be passing. He chose to film on top of a  concrete abutment which extends from a retaining wall that was part of the John Neely Bryan concrete pergola on the grassy knoll north of Elm Street, in Dealey Plaza. Zapruder's secretary, Marilyn Sitzman, offered to assist Zapruder as he suffered from vertigo and was apprehensive about standing on the abutment alone.

While Sitzman stood behind Zapruder and held his coat to steady him, he began filming the presidential motorcade as it turned from Houston Street onto Elm Street in front of the Book Depository. Zapruder's film captured 26.6 seconds of the traveling motorcade carrying President Kennedy on 486 frames of Kodak Kodachrome II safety film. Zapruder's film captured the fatal head shot that struck President Kennedy as his limousine passed almost directly in front of Zapruder and Sitzman's position,  from the center of Elm Street.

Zapruder later recalled that he immediately knew that President Kennedy's wound was fatal as he saw the president's head "...explode like a firecracker." Walking back to his office amid the confusion following the shots, Zapruder encountered The Dallas Morning News reporter Harry McCormick, who was standing near Zapruder and noticed he was filming the motorcade. McCormick was acquainted with Agent Forrest Sorrels of the Secret Service's Dallas office, and offered to bring Sorrels to Zapruder's office. Zapruder agreed and returned to his office. McCormick later found Sorrels outside the Sheriff's office at Main and Houston, and together they went to Zapruder's office.

Zapruder agreed to give the film to Sorrels on the condition it would be used only for investigation of the assassination. The three then took the film to the television station WFAA to be developed. After it was realized that WFAA was unable to develop Zapruder's footage, the film was taken to Eastman Kodak's Dallas processing plant later that afternoon where it was immediately developed. As the Kodachrome process requires different equipment for duplication than for simple development, Zapruder's film was not developed until around 6:30 p.m. The original developed film was taken to the Jamieson Film Company, where three additional copies were exposed; these were returned to Kodak around 8 p.m. for processing. Zapruder kept the original, plus one copy, and gave the other two copies to Sorrels, who sent them to Secret Service headquarters in Washington.

Television interview
While at WFAA, Zapruder described on live television the assassination of President Kennedy:

Sale of rights
Late that evening, Zapruder was contacted at home by Richard Stolley, an editor at Life magazine (and first editor of the future People magazine). They arranged to meet the following morning to view the film, after which Zapruder sold the print rights to Life for $50,000. Stolley was representing Time/Life on behalf of publisher Charles Douglas Jackson.

The following day (November 24), Life purchased all rights to the film for a total of $150,000 (approximately $ today).

The night after the assassination, Zapruder said that he had a nightmare in which he saw a booth in Times Square advertising "See the President's head explode!" He determined that, while he was willing to make money from the film, he did not want the public to see the full horror of what he had seen. Therefore, a condition of the sale to Life was that frame 313, showing the fatal shot, would be withheld. Although he made a profit from selling the film, he asked that the amount he was paid not be publicly disclosed. He later donated $25,000 (about $ today) of the money he was paid to the widow of Officer J. D. Tippit, a Dallas police officer who was shot and killed by Lee Harvey Oswald 45 minutes after President Kennedy was killed.

In 1975, Time, Inc. (which owned Life magazine) sold the film back to the Zapruder family for $1. In 1978, the Zapruders allowed the film to be stored at the National Archives and Records Administration where it remains. In 1999, the Zapruders donated the copyright of the film to the Sixth Floor Museum at Dealey Plaza.

Testimony
In his testimony to the Warren Commission, Zapruder was asked for his impression regarding the direction of the shots:

Zapruder added that he had assumed the shots came from behind him because the President's head went backwards from the fatal shot, and also that the wound on the side of the President's head was facing that direction. He also said he believed it because police officers ran to the area behind him.

He broke down and wept as he recalled the assassination, and did so again at the 1969 trial of Clay Shaw.

Death
Zapruder died of stomach cancer in Dallas on August 30, 1970, at Parkland Memorial Hospital, and is buried in the Emanu-El Cemetery in Dallas.

In popular culture
 Australian actor, comedian, presenter and film producer Andrew Denton co-founded a production company in 1989 named Zapruder's Other Films.
 Timequest, a 2000 film in which Kennedy's assassination was prevented by a time traveler, had Zapruder (Andrew Dunn) instead aiming his camera at the fence behind the grassy knoll and filming Robert F. Kennedy after a would be second gunman was killed by his men, then having his footage confiscated by a Secret Service agent, but eventually obtained by a movie director and shown on television several decades later.
 Arcanum, a 2001 computer game, has a character named Isaac Zapruder who is deceased from the beginning of the game.  His corpse contains his camera that provides proof that an inventor’s flying machines were able to fly, before they were destroyed by thieves in a kamikaze attack that crashed the blimp on which Isaac was a passenger.  Isaac is the son of Abraham in chapter 22 of the Book of Genesis.
 Paul Giamatti portrays Zapruder in the 2013 film Parkland, which dramatizes Zapruder's life on the weekend of the assassination.

Notes

References

External links

Warren Commission Hearings, Testimony of Abraham Zapruder, vol. 7, p. 569.
Zapruder's testimony during the Clay Shaw trial
The Zapruder Camera - Bell & Howell 414PD Director Series - Overview and User's Manual
Zapruder Film 

 

1905 births
1970 deaths
20th-century American businesspeople
American fashion businesspeople
American Freemasons
American people of Ukrainian-Jewish descent
Businesspeople from Dallas
Businesspeople from New York City
Burials in Texas
Deaths from cancer in Texas
Deaths from stomach cancer
Jews from the Russian Empire
People from Kovel
People from Kovelsky Uyezd
Texas Democrats
Polish emigrants to the United States
Ukrainian Jews
Witnesses to the assassination of John F. Kennedy